Route 18 is a  state highway in the central part of the US state of New Jersey. It begins at an intersection with Route 138 in Wall Township, Monmouth County and ends at Interstate 287 (I-287) in Piscataway Township, Middlesex County. Route 18 is a major route through central New Jersey that connects the Jersey Shore to the Raritan Valley region, connecting the county seats of Monmouth (Freehold) and Middlesex (New Brunswick) respectively. The route runs through Ocean Township, Marlboro Township, and East Brunswick, as for much of the route is a limited-access freeway (including the entire portion in Monmouth County and much of the northern end through New Brunswick and Piscataway). The remainder of the route is a multi-lane divided highway with traffic lights in the East Brunswick and Old Bridge areas. Route 18 was designated in 1939 as a proposed freeway from Old Bridge to Eatontown. The section west of Old Bridge was formerly designated as part Route S28, a prefixed spur of State Highway Route 28 from Middlesex to Matawan. The designation, assigned in the 1927 renumbering, remained until a second renumbering in 1953. At that point, Route S28 was redesignated as Route 18, though the section from Old Bridge to Matawan was signed as TEMP 18, as this section would be decommissioned when the Route 18 freeway was built.

The route originally ended at Route 27 at the border between Highland Park and New Brunswick, but was extended northward to then-County Route 514 Spur (CR 514 Spur), now CR 622, in 1983. The freeway through New Brunswick was constructed during the 1980s over the Delaware and Raritan Canal. Route 18 was further extended to Hoes Lane in Piscataway in 2004 and presently ends at I-287 in Piscataway. The route south of exit 6A in Wall Township was also originally intended to extend to the Brielle Circle and terminate at Route 34, Route 35, and Route 70 but there are no plans to do so currently.

Route description

Monmouth County
Route 18 begins at a partial-cloverleaf interchange with Route 138 in Wall Township. At the southern end of the interchange, the right-of-way and unused pavement for the southern extension is visible along with the former on-ramp from Route 138 to Route 18 northbound. The highway heads northward as a four-lane freeway, crossing under Route 138. Route 18 interchanges with Route 138 westbound and Monmouth Boulevard, a local road in New Bedford. Route 18 then crosses under Monmouth Boulevard and County Route 18 (Belmar Boulevard) in the community of Glendola. The route continues through Glendola, and interchanges with Brighton Avenue (southbound Interchanges 7A and 7B). The freeway continues south of the Shark River Golf Course, through Neptune, paralleling Brighton Avenue, and interchanges with Route 33 and County Route 17 at exit 8. Although signed as exit 8 northbound, the interchange is divided into exits 8A and 8B heading southbound. The roadway crosses into Ocean Township and crosses under County Route 17 (West Bangs Avenue). In Ocean Township, there are exits for Route 66 and Asbury Avenue, Deal Road, and West Park Avenue. Farther north, the highway enters Eatontown.

A large interchange near the Naval Weapons Station Earle serves Industrial Way West, County Route 547 (Wyckoff Road), Route 36, Hope Road, the Garden State Parkway, the Tinton Falls interchange (exit 105), and County Route 38 (Wayside Road). After passing over the Southern Secondary railroad line operated by the Delaware and Raritan River Railroad, the route continues northwestward into Colts Neck. The freeway continues to the northwest through wooded land for several miles, crossing over Normandy Road and to the south of the Pebble Creek Golf Club. Exits along this stretch include Route 34, County Route 537 (Colts Neck Road), Route 79 (South Main Street), County Route 520, and County Route 3 (Tennent Road), which connects to Freehold Borough and Marlboro Township.

Middlesex County 

After entering Middlesex County, Route 18 continues north as a freeway, entering Old Bridge Township. After interchanging with U.S. Route 9 (exit 30), the freeway ends, and the route becomes an arterial highway through a mostly wooded commercial stretch of Old Bridge Township. The route crosses several roads in this area. It then passes under County Route 516 and County Route 527 (Old Bridge-Matawan Road), but has no northbound interchange to connect with them; motorists have to travel through a residential area to access these roads. On the southbound side, motorists can use a cloverleaf or Englishtown Road. Route 18 then crosses the South River into East Brunswick and passes over Conrail Shared Assets Operations' (CSAO) Amboy Secondary before interchanging with Middlesex County Route 615, which also connects to County Route 527.

Route 18 then continues through the heavily developed commercial corridor of East Brunswick, intersecting with County Route 617 (Rues Lane) and passing near Brunswick Square Mall. After the interchanges with County Routes 535 (Cranbury Road) and County Route 606 (Milltown Road), Route 18 passes over CSAO's Bonhamtown Industrial Track line and intersects West Ferris Street, West Prospect Street, Tices Lane, and then meets County Route 527 (the Old Bridge Turnpike) at Edgeboro Road. An intersection and partial interchange with Eggers Street and JFK Boulevard is followed by crossing over the New Jersey Turnpike (I-95) at exit 9 of the turnpike. The road then intersects Tower Center Boulevard before crossing into  New Brunswick at Lawrence Brook.

The U.S. Route 1 interchange is followed by an intersection at Paulus Boulevard before separating into a local/express configuration and paralleling the Raritan River, passing the former New Brunswick city docks. Local exits include Route 172 (the southern terminus of George Street), the Rutgers University boathouse and Elmer B. Boyd Park, Commercial Avenue, New Street, and Route 27 (Albany Street), after which the express and local lanes merge back together and cross under the Raritan River Bridge carrying Amtrak's Northeast Corridor. The freeway continues with exits for George Street, Rutgers (for access to the College Avenue Campus) and Easton Avenue before exiting New Brunswick on the John A. Lynch, Sr. Memorial Bridge over the Raritan River.

The highway then interchanges with County Route 622 (River Road), Campus Road (Rutgers' Busch Campus and stadium), Metlars Lane (Rutgers' Livingston Campus and Rutgers Athletic Center), where the route curves to the west and becomes Hoes Lane, a surface arterial. As Hoes Lane, Route 18 passes Resurrection Cemetery of the Diocese of Metuchen, as well as the post office and township hall of the Township of Piscataway, before reaching an intersection with Centennial Avenue. From this intersection, Route 18 is considered to exist both on Centennial Avenue and Possumtown Road, and ends in each case at the respective entrance ramps for I-287.

History and future

Designation and southern freeway construction 

Route 18 partly follows the course of the Middlesex and Matawan Turnpike (commonly called the Old Bridge Turnpike), legislated in 1863 to run from the south branch of the Raritan River to Matawan. The alignment of Route 18 through Middlesex County from Middlesex to Highland Park was first designated in the 1927 designing of a new highway system as State Highway Route S-29, a prefixed spur of New Jersey Route 29 (U.S. Route 22) through Middlesex County. The route followed Washington Avenue in Middlesex and the River Road in Piscataway until terminating at State Highway Route 27 near the Albany Street Bridge in Highland Park. By the time of the 1927 New Jersey state highway renumbering, the route was re-designated as State Highway Route S-28. This route was a prefixed spur of State Highway Route 28 in Middlesex, following Raritan Avenue and River Road through Piscataway and Highland Park, joining State Highway Route 27 on a concurrency into New Brunswick, and onto George Street in New Brunswick southward. After New Brunswick, Route S-28 continued southward through East Brunswick, Old Bridge and Browntown before terminating at State Highway Route 4 (U.S. Route 9) in Matawan.

The route was originally designated as an east–west highway, whereas it is now signed north-south. Although Route S-28 was used for the alignment for nearly three decades, the second state highway renumbering in 1953 eliminated the designation, and Route 18 was designated in place.

During the 1950s, as the New Jersey State Highway Department was drawing out plans for an extensive freeway system, freeways were proposed for Route 18 and nearby Route 35. Route 18's freeway was to begin in Eatontown and head westward to Old Bridge Township along the former alignment of State Highway Route 18 prior to the 1953 renumbering, while Route 35 was to be rerouted from its surface alignment and head northward from Seaside Heights to Long Branch on a new freeway. Both plans were endorsed by the Tri-State Transportation Committee in 1962, and the acquisition for the right-of-ways began almost immediately. The freeways combined were to cost $50 million (1962 USD) and be  in total. Both freeways were designed to handle 30,000–50,000 vehicles daily.

The freeway was completed between Route 138 and Route 33 in 1967 and Route 33 and Deal Road in 1969. Following this, the Route 35 freeway was cancelled and it became the part of Route 18 south of Eatontown. In 1974, Route 18 was completed between just south of Normandy Road in Colts Neck and US 9. A small portion of the freeway between Obre Road and Normandy Road in Colts Neck was finished in 1977. Route 18 was built between Wayside Road and Obre Road in 1978. The final portion of the Route 18 between Deal Road and Wayside Road was finished in 1988.

Freeway around New Brunswick 

The proposals for a freeway bypassing New Brunswick began in 1962, when the New Jersey State Highway Department made plans to construct a new freeway from U.S. Route 1 through New Brunswick to U.S. Route 22 in Bound Brook. The extension to Bound Brook, however, was canceled in the 1970s because of tight funding.

Construction of a new four-lane bridge across the Raritan River (now the John A. Lynch Memorial Bridge) began in the 1960s, but in 1970, when the environment impact laws came out, construction froze with only three massive piers standing out of the river. Outside of the bridge, there was significant controversy over the abandoned Delaware and Raritan Canal heading through New Brunswick. The new freeway was to supplant the former canal and its thirteenth lock in New Brunswick, abandoned in 1932. The environmentalists and the historic preservationists opposed the freeway extension because of the fears of losing the canal, while companies like Johnson & Johnson supported the new highway for redeveloping New Brunswick.

In 1977, the newly formed New Jersey Department of Transportation received a federal grant to construct the Route 18 Freeway from New Street in New Brunswick, across the Raritan and terminating at Middlesex County Route 514 Spur in Piscataway. This  portion was completed in 1983 at a cost of $40 million (about $ in  dollars), with a finished bridge and freeway through New Brunswick.

In 2005, construction began on a revamped Route 18 freeway through New Brunswick. The rebuild includes local and express lanes from Route 172 (George Street) to the interchange with Route 27 (Albany Street). Conti Enterprises was hired for the project, which was announced complete in August 2009 at a ceremony by governor Jon S. Corzine and Stephen Dilts, the commissioner of the New Jersey Department of Transportation. During the construction, the New Street interchange and bridge were demolished and replaced. The area of the Paulus Boulevard intersection was upgraded for accessibility, and a bus stop was installed, but the roadway southbound is still three lanes at the traffic light. In adjacent Elmer Boyd Park a new entranceway and amphitheatre were added.

Extension through Piscataway and to Brielle

Piscataway

In 2001, the New Jersey Department of Transportation approved construction of extending the Route 18 Freeway northward from Middlesex County Route 622 (River Road, former CR 514 Spur) in Piscataway to a new arterial on the existing Hoes Lane in the Rutgers University campuses. Construction of this segment, designated as Section 2A, built a partial cloverleaf interchange to County Route 622, a trumpet interchange to Frelinghuysen Avenue (the access to Busch Campus) and a partial cloverleaf to County Route 609 (Metlars Lane) and Davidson Road. The project cost the state $85 million (2004 USD).

The Department of Transportation then planned the extension to Interstate 287 in Piscataway, by upgrading Hoes Lane's arterial boulevard and its 20 intersections to standards, eliminating and upgrading several traffic lights. On February 15, 2012, the New Jersey Department of Transportation broke ground on the project, which was completed in mid-2016. Following the completion of the project, Route 18 turns off Hoes Lane at Centennial Ave., follows Centennial to Possumtown Road, and terminates at Interstate 287 exit 8.

Brielle
There has been scrutiny about the stub end at Exit 6A for Route 138 that was to be a part of an extension of the freeway for its final five miles (8 km) from Route 138 to the Brielle Circle. Some of the right-of-way that was acquired in the 1960s for the Route 35 freeway were transformed into a multi-use trail for bicycles and other vehicles to link the Wall Township Municipal Complex to the existing Edgar Felix Bikeway that runs from Manasquan to Allaire State Park. In 2001, the Brielle Circle was replaced with a new four-approach interchange between Route 35, Route 34 and Route 70, but the project included no hint of the Route 18 Extension. NJDOT is in planning to create a Park & Ride at the southern terminus of the Route 18 freeway. It will be placed along the four lane right of way just south of Route 138. Residents are in opposition to this proposal for fear of loitering and vandalism that may accompany the parking lot.

New exit ramp in Old Bridge Township
Construction was slated for the interchange with County Routes 516 and 527 in Old Bridge Township as there is no way to access either of them without driving through a residential area off Route 18. The traffic flow along CR 516 (Old Bridge Township into Matawan) and 527 (Old Bridge Township into Englishtown/Manalapan Township) has increased significantly in the past ten years which called for the exit ramp off Route 18. The Old Bridge improvements include adding inside shoulders and widening County Routes 516 and 527. A signalized ramp is to be added for access to County Routes 516 and 527. Subsequently, County Route 516's intersection with Old Matawan Road is to be relocated. The project would cost over $28 million and was slated to begin in 2009 and to end in 2010. As of the end of 2009 the large project was put on hold because of the lack of funds and the economic situation. Demolition was completed in 2009 on Marlboro Road, taking down several residential houses and along Old Matawan Road and CR 516 and taking down an old gas station in preparing for the project. There is no new date released by NJDOT in when construction will begin. The CR 516 bridge over Route 18 had since been replaced in 2016 with no interchange improvements.

Major intersections
Exit numbers and mileposts are based on the originally planned southern terminus of Route 18 at Route 34, Route 35, and Route 70 at the former Brielle Circle that includes the  unbuilt section from Brielle to Route 138.

See also

References

External links

1964 plans for roads in the New York City area, including Route 18 and Route 35
New Jersey Roadtrips – New Jersey 18 Photos

018
Limited-access roads in New Jersey
Transportation in Middlesex County, New Jersey
Transportation in Monmouth County, New Jersey